ckb:ئەیالەتی کوردستان

Kurdistan Eyalet (Ottoman Turkish: Eyâlet-i Kurdistan) was an eyalet of the Ottoman Empire. It was the first time that the Ottoman Empire used the term "Kurdistan" to refer to an administrative unit rather than a geographical region. It was formed with the aim of establishing direct control over Kurdistan, rather than recognizing it as a political entity.

History 
It was a short-lived province as it only lasted about 21 years, between 1846 and 1867. One year after its establishment the Kurdish strongman Bedir Khan Beg and former ruler of large parts of the Kurdistan Eyalet, was defeated in his castle in Eruh. Following the region lacked of a powerful Kurdish ruler which led to the rise of the religious sheikhs belonging to the Naqshbandi and Qadiriyya dervish orders, or tariqas. In 1867 it was abolished and succeeded by the Diyarbekir Vilayet. During its existence, it saw twelve different governors who had either the title of müsir or vizier.

Extension 
Initially the eyalet covered the region of the former Kurdish Emirate of Bohtan, but it was expanded gradually and at its widest extension included the former Diyarbekir Eyalet and the areas around Van, Hakkari and Muş, as well as the districts of Botan, Mardin, and Cizre. According to the salnames between 1847 and 1867, it was ruled by the central Ottoman government and received annual funding of 80,000 piastres, considerably more than the Mosul Eyalet. In 1853 the eyalet counted with four sancaks, namely the ones of Diyarbakir, Muş, Siirt and Dersim. The tax register of 1852 also named the cities Cizre, Muş and Hakkari among others.

References 

History of Diyarbakır Province